DYKI (89.9 FM), broadcasting as 89.9 MemoRieS FM, is a radio station owned and operated by Primax Broadcasting Network. Its studios and transmitter facilities are located at the Suite 106, Vacation Hotel Cebu, #35 Juana Osmena St, Cebu City.

History
The station was established in 1998 as K-Lite 89.9, airing an Indie pop and Alternative rock format. It became an affiliate of Raven Broadcasting Corporation in Manila, which owns a station with City Lite. The following year, it was rebranded as K89.9. In early 2000, the station ceased to be an affiliate as RBC changed hands and rebranded as Smooth FM 89.9 with the tagline "Your Life, Your Music". It switched to a smooth jazz format. In late-January 2017, Smooth FM 89.9 quietly signed off for the last time and went off the air for a week.

In March 2017, the station became an affiliate of the RMN Networks and rebranded as 89.9 MemoRieS FM with a classic hits format.

References

Radio stations in Metro Cebu
Radio stations established in 1998